The Hunt: Me and the War Criminals is a book written by Carla Del Ponte, published in April 2008. According to Del Ponte she received information saying about 300 Serbs were kidnapped and transferred to Albania in 1999 where their organs were extracted. The book caused a considerable controversy with Kosovan and Albanian officials denying these allegations and Russian and Serbian officials demanding more investigation. ICTY stated no substantial evidence supporting the allegations was brought to the court.

On 12 December 2010, the Council of Europe released a provisional report confirming Ms Del Ponte's allegations, and naming both Shaip Muja, current political adviser to the Kosovar Prime Minister, and Prime Minister Hashim Thaqi himself, in this context.

Organ traffic allegations

According to the Del Ponte's book the prosecutor's office received information from UNMIK officials who had in turn received it from "a team of trustworthy journalists" that some 300 kidnapped Serbians were taken with trucks from Kosovo to several camps in Kukës and Tropojë (Albania) during the summer of 1999, shortly after the arrival of NATO troops in Kosovo. There their organs were extracted to be sold in foreign countries.

Reactions

Organisations 
The International Criminal Tribunal for the former Yugoslavia had said of Del Ponte's allegations: "The Tribunal is aware of very serious allegations of human organ trafficking raised by the former Prosecutor, Carla Del Ponte, in a book recently published in Italian under her name. No evidence in support of such allegations was ever brought before the Tribunal's judges."

A spokeswoman for the UN War Crimes Tribunal says that during a preliminary investigation in cooperation with Albania and UNMIK "no reliable evidence had been obtained to substantiate the allegations."

On 4 April 2008, the Human Rights Watch wrote to Kosovar Prime Minister Hashim Thaci and Albanian Prime Minister Sali Berisha in request to open investigations on the matter under international supervision. By 3 May both had ignored the letters and instead publicly rejected Del Ponte's claims as unsubstantiated. On 5 May 2008, the Human Rights Watch called the allegations from Del Ponte's book "serious and credible" and issued a public call to Tirana and Pristina for cooperation.

The reported alleges the victims were more than 400 Serbs missing from the war. "Serious and credible allegations have emerged about horrible abuses in Kosovo and Albania after the war", said Fred Abrahams, HWR Senior emergencies researcher of HRW.

A provisional report by the Council of Europe, released on 12 December 2010, confirmed the allegations.

Albania
Pandeli Majko, Albanian Prime Minister during the Kosovo war, has rejected the allegations in Del Ponte's book as "strange stories, a fantasy".

Kosovo
Nekibe Kelmendi, Kosovo's Minister of Justice said Del Ponte's allegations "are pure fabrications made by Del Ponte or perhaps Serbia herself". "If she knew of such cases then she should be charged with withholding evidence and hiding these crimes", Kelmendi said.

Council for the Defense of Human Rights and Freedoms has announced they will sue Del Ponte for publishing lies in her book.

Switzerland
The Swiss government has asked Del Ponte not to promote her book. It has been criticized for tarnishing the country's celebrated neutrality, particularly as Del Ponte has been named as the Swiss ambassador to Argentina.

Editions
 Chuck Sudetic, Carla Del Ponte, La caccia: Io e i criminali di guerra, Feltrinelli, Milano, (2008), .

References

External links
Revelations in Carla del Ponte's book

2008 non-fiction books
International Criminal Tribunal for the former Yugoslavia
International law literature
Non-fiction works about the Bosnian genocide
Non-fiction books about the Bosnian War
Cultural depictions of Radovan Karadžić
Italian non-fiction books